Charlie Higgins (February 26, 1878 - November 25, 1967) was an American old time fiddle player from Galax, Virginia. Higgins said that he was influenced by other old-time fiddlers including Emmett Lundy and Fiddlin' Arthur Smith.  His style of playing was said to be very innovative and creative. Higgins played regularly with Wade Ward, Dale Poe and other old-time musicians in the Galax area.  Recordings of Charlie Higgins are few, and limited to field recordings made between 1959 and 1961 by folklorists Alan Lomax, Peter Hoover and John Cohen.  At the time of these recordings Higgins was over eighty years of age, and apparently was not recorded during his prime.  However, he was still good enough at age 82 to win first place at the 1960 Galax Old Fiddler's Convention.  Higgins died in 1967 and is buried with his wife Mallie at the Coal Creek Community Church in Galax, Virginia.

Discography

See also
Old-time music

References

External links
Audio sample of "Blackberry Blossom" (1961)
MP3 Audio sample of "Charlie's Breakdown" (1959)

American fiddlers
People from Galax, Virginia
1878 births
1967 deaths
Musicians from Virginia
Old-time fiddlers